Peter VI may refer to:

 Patriarch Peter VI of Alexandria (7th–8th centuries)
 Pope Peter VI of Alexandria (1718–1726)